Digermane is an inorganic compound with the chemical formula Ge2H6. One of the few hydrides of germanium, it is a colourless liquid. Its molecular geometry is similar to ethane.

Synthesis 
Digermane was first synthesized and examined in 1924 by Dennis, Corey, and Moore.  Their method involves the hydrolysis of magnesium germanide using hydrochloric acid. Many of the properties of digermane and trigermane were determined in the following decade using electron diffraction studies. Further considerations of the compound involved examinations of various reactions such as pyrolysis and oxidation.

Digermane is produced together with germane by the reduction of germanium dioxide with sodium borohydride. Although the major product is germane, a quantifiable amount of digermane is produced in addition to traces of trigermane. It also arises by the hydrolysis of magnesium-germanium alloys.

Reactions 
The reactions of digermane exhibit some differences between analogous compounds of the Group 14 elements carbon and silicon. However, there are still some similarities seen, especially in regards to pyrolysis reactions.

The oxidation of digermane takes place at lower temperatures than monogermane. The product of the reaction, germanium oxide, has been shown to act in turn as a catalyst of the reaction. This exemplifies a fundamental difference between germanium and the other Group 14 elements carbon and silicon (carbon dioxide and silicon dioxide do not exhibit the same catalytic properties).

2Ge2H6 + 7O2 → 4GeO2 + 6H2O

In liquid ammonia, digermane undergoes disproportionation. Ammonia acts as a weakly basic catalyst. Products of the reaction are hydrogen, germane, and a solid polymeric germanium hydride.

Pyrolysis of digermane is proposed to follow multiple steps:
Ge2H6 → 2GeH3
GeH3 + Ge2H6 → GeH4 + Ge2H5
Ge2H5 → GeH2 + GeH3
GeH2 → Ge + H2
2GeH2 → GeH4 + Ge
nGeH2 → (GeH2)n

This pyrolysis has been found to be more endothermic than the pyrolysis of disilane.  This difference is attributed to the greater strength of the Ge-H bond vs the Si-H bond. As seen in the last reaction of the mechanism above, pyrolysis of digermane may induce polymerization of the GeH2 group, where GeH3 acts as a chain propagator and molecular hydrogen gas is released. The dehydrogenation of digermane on gold leads to the formation of germanium nanowires.

Digermane is a precursor to Ge2H5ECF3, where E is either sulfur or selenium. These trifluoromethylthio and trifluoromethylseleno derivatives possess a markedly higher thermal stability than digermane itself.

Applications 
Digermane has a limited number of applications; germane itself is the preferred volatile germanium hydride. Generally, digermane is primarily used a precursor to germanium for use in various applications. Digermane can be used to deposit Ge-containing semiconductors via chemical vapor deposition.

References

Germanium compounds
Metal hydrides
Substances discovered in the 1920s
Chemical compounds containing metal–metal bonds